Kfar Tikvah (in English means: Village of Hope) is an Israeli institution near Kiryat Tiv'on, where the disabled live together in the style of a kibbutz.

History 
Kfar Tikvah was founded in 1963 under the leadership of Sigfried Hirsch by a group of Israelis on the top of a mountain near Kiryat Tiv'on. With the help of German volunteers from a German association and with the help of some German donors, they started to implement the vision of the founders in the same year. The establishment was inaugurated in 1964.

Idea 
Sigfried Hirsch and his co-workers founded Kfar Tikvah on the site of the abandoned Kibbutz Givat Zaid. Here Hirsch's idea was to become reality. A place where disabled people can live like other people. This idea culminated in the saying Dr. Hirsch's on the Day of Inauguration of Kfar Tikvah: "They should live like us!". Thus Kfar Tikvah today sees itself as a "kibbutz" of a special kind, also or precisely because one does not belong to the kibbutz movement. The disabled people of the village understand themselves as members (Haverim) of this "kibbutz" and assume, as far as possible, tasks and duties for the community. Since the construction of the village on the site of the former Kibbutz Givat Zaid, which took place in 1963 with the help of German volunteers, Kfar Tikvah has become something of a sign of German-Israeli relations.

Structure 
Basically, the structure of the village corresponds to that of a kibbutz. The management consists of parents or ward representatives, employees and representatives of the disabled. This is the main difference from other disabled facilities. In Kfar Tikvah, the disabled people who live here as members of this "kibbutz" have a right to speak, also on leadership level. The elected representatives of the disabled have the right of co-determination and co-decision, for instance in the occupation of workplaces, in projects, or in the reception of new members. Changing work and responsibility for others and the group, that makes Kfar Tikvah so special.

Work 
Kfar Tikvah offers about 200 disabled people a job. In addition to the daily work that is necessary in such a facility, Such as gardening or laundry and housekeeping, the leased business enterprises located on the site of the village offer additional jobs.

Business operations 
On the Kfar Tikvah site there is a winery, a dog breeding and a candle factory. These farms are leased under the obligation to secure Haverim jobs. Especially the wine from the Kfar Tikvah winery is well-known. The current project is the ceramic workshop. The German Embassy in Tel Aviv, has made the construction possible through its donation. Production has been running for a few weeks, and some jobs have been created for the disabled people.

Learning 
Kfar Tikvah was the first disabled facility to convince the University of Haifa to offer its educational programs for the disabled. Since then, the university has been using the program for the training of students in social professions and offers the chaverim and their families the opportunity to work out an individual learning program together. In this way, a unique project that benefits both sides, the university and its students in training and Kfar Tikvah, was created by the special support of its members.

German-Israeli cooperation 
Without this cooperation Kfar Tikvah would not have been conceivable. They were German volunteers from the association, which in 1963 designed the buildings of the former Kibbutz Givat Shaul for the disabled. Since then, Kfar Tikvah has been an active and special sign of German-Israeli and Christian-Jewish cooperation. Here, German, Israeli, Jewish and Christian volunteers work together with the other chaverim. This cooperation is repeatedly appreciated by the visit of the German delegations and the German foreign affairs minister.

References

External links 

 

Villages in Israel
Kiryat Tiv'on
1963 establishments in Israel